USS Chotauk (IX-188), an unclassified miscellaneous vessel,
was the victim of a typographical error: she was intended to be named for USS Chotank.
Her keel was laid down in 1920 by Bethlehem Shipbuilding Corporation's Fore River Shipyard in Quincy, Massachusetts, as Japan Arrow (later renamed American Arrow), transferred from the War Shipping Administration at Pearl Harbor on 29 November 1944, and commissioned the same day.

Chotauk served as a station tanker with the Pacific Fleet at Eniwetok from 3 January to 14 February 1945, Ulithi from 23 February to 10 July, and Okinawa from 17 July to 29 October. She returned to Mobile, Alabama, on 5 January 1946. Chotauk was decommissioned there and returned to the War Shipping Administration on 7 February 1946.

References 

Mobile storage tankers of the United States Navy
Ships built in Quincy, Massachusetts
1920 ships